Nelson Garner (born 1976-02-23) is an American football placekicker. He spent time in the Arena Football League with the Albany/Indiana Firebirds (2000–2002), the Arizona Rattlers (2003–2004), and the Georgia Force (2005–2006).

He tried out for the Baltimore Ravens in 1998 and 1999.

College career
While attending James Madison University, Garner competed at both, kicker and punter. He was a three-time All-Conference selection, was named the Special Teams MVP as a junior, and as a senior, played in the Blue–Gray Football Classic.

References

1976 births
Living people
People from Burlington, North Carolina
American football placekickers
James Madison Dukes football players
Albany Firebirds players
Indiana Firebirds players
Arizona Rattlers players
Georgia Force players